The Baloncesto Superior Nacional, abbreviated as BSN, is the first-tier-level professional men's basketball league in Puerto Rico. It was founded in 1929 and is organized by the Puerto Rican Basketball Federation.

The Baloncesto Superior Nacional, which is played under FIBA rules, currently consists of 12
teams, of which the most successful has been the Vaqueros de Bayamón with 16 titles as of 2022. The league has produced players that have distinguished themselves in the NBA, EuroLeague, Spain's ACB, and other tournaments throughout the world. Among them, Georgie Torres was the first Puerto Rican to sign an NBA contract & Butch Lee was the first BSN player to win an NBA title. Later on came players like José Ortiz, Ramón Rivas, Daniel Santiago, Carlos Arroyo and José Juan Barea, who were other NBA players that started their careers playing for BSN teams.

History
The league began in 1930, and is noted for having had several head coaches who went on to achieve international recognition later in their careers. Among those are Basketball Hall of Fame members Dr. Jack Ramsay, Tex Winter and Red Holzman, who coached the Leones de Ponce in the 1950s and 1960s, and Phil Jackson, who coached the Piratas de Quebradillas and Gallitos de Isabela in the late 1980s. Others notable coaches who have worked for BSN teams include Gene Bartow, Lou Rossini, Del Harris, P. J. Carlesimo, Bernie Bickerstaff and Herb Brown.

During the 1980s, notable players followed in the footsteps of players such as Juan "Pachin" Vicens (1959 Santiago Chile FIBA World Championship's All-Tournament Team) and Butch Lee, the first Puerto Rican and BSN player to enter the NBA. Among those are: Mario 'Quijote' Morales, Raymond Dalmau, Jose 'Piculin' Ortiz, Ramón Rivas, Jerome Mincy, Georgie Torres, Angelo Cruz, Angel Santiago, the late Federico 'Fico' Lopez, Rolando Frazer, Mario Butler, and Rubén Rodríguez, who showcased their talents to all of Puerto Rico's TV viewers and game goers.

On October 8, 2015, the BSN team owners selected Fernando Quiñones Bodea to succeed Carlos J. Beltrán as president of the league.

Competition format

Regular season

The BSN tournament is played under the regular FIBA basketball rules. The twelve teams each play a total of four games amongst themselves, two at home and two away, for a total of 44 games during the regular season. Of the 12 participating teams, the top 8 move on to the postseason.

Postseason

Current teams

Defunct teams
 Atenienses de Manatí (2014–2017); played their home games at the Juan Cruz Abreu Coliseum
 Avancinos de Villalba (1996–1998); played their home games at the José Ibem Marrero Coliseum
 Conquistadores de Aguada (1994–1998)
 Criollos de Caguas (1976–2009); played their home games at Héctor Solá Besares Coliseum
 Gallitos de Isabela; played their home games at the Jose Abreu Coliseum
 Indios de Canóvanas; layed their home games at Coliseo Carlos Miguel Mangual
 Maratonistas de Coamo (1985–1996, 1999–2015); layed their home games at Edwin "Puruco" Nolasco Coliseum
 Polluelos de Aibonito (1977–2001); played their home games at Cancha Marron Aponte
 Santeros de Aguada (2016–2020); played their home games at the Ismael Delgado Coliseum
 Taínos de Cabo Rojo (1989–1993); played their home games at Rebekah Colberg Cabrera Coliseum
 Tiburones de Aguadilla (1990s–1998); played their home games at the Luis T. Diaz Coliseum
 Titanes de Morovis (1977–2006); layed their home games in the José Pepe Huyke Coliseum
 Toritos de Cayey (2002–2004); played their home games at the Cayey Municipal Coliseum

League records
Rubén Rodríguez established most of the early long-standing records in the BSN. He broke both the single-season points record with 810 in 1978 and the highest career points record with 11,549. The current holder of the career mark is Georgie Torres, who broke it before retiring in 2001 with 15,863 points in 679 games, playing his first 7 years before the establishment of the three-point line. Rodríguez also holds the mark for most rebounds in a career with 6,178. He also held the single-season rebound record with 380 in 1978, which stood until Lee Benson broke it in 2008. Currently, Neftalí Rivera holds the record for most points in a game in the Baloncesto Superior Nacional when he scored 79 points on May 22, 1974. In that game he achieved the record by making 34 field goals (all of them 2-pointers as 3-pointers were not adopted back then) and 11 free throws. In 1989, Pablo Alicea of the Gigantes de Carolina established a record for most assists in one game with 25. The record stood for over two decades until May 1, 2012, when Jonathan García of the Caciques de Humacao broke it recording 33 assists against the Brujos de Guayama. García's mark is an unofficial world record pending the approval of Guinness World Records, since there is no higher number recorded in any amateur or professional international league or in FIBA competition. During this game, the Caciques also established the team points record for a single game with 130 and for most scored during a single (10-minute) quarter with 46. The Vaqueros de Bayamón hosted the game with highest attendance in the league, with 17,621 fans attending a home game against Río Piedras on September 8, 1969. This bested the previous top of 16,564 in a game between Ponce and Santurce. The Vaqueros also hold the record for most consecutive championships, winning five from 1971 to 1975.

Championships

Number of championships won by teams

 *These titles are from Farmacia Martin, a team that later merged with the Atléticos de San Germán

BSN awards

BSN statistical leaders

BSN all-time scoring leaders

Note: Christian Dalmau has been updated to show that he retired in 2017 - but his stats (and all stats in this section) are from 2015.

BSN all-time rebounding leaders

BSN all-time assists leaders

Note: Christian Dalmau has been updated to show that he retired in 2017 - but his stats (and all stats in this section) are from 2015.

BSN all-time block leaders

Last Updated July 9, 2015

See also
 Puerto Rico national basketball team

References

External links 
 Official site 
 Puerto Rican league on Latinbasket.com 

 
Basketball leagues in Puerto Rico
1929 establishments in Puerto Rico
Sports leagues established in 1929
Professional sports leagues in the United States
Professional sports leagues in Puerto Rico